R100 is a Japanese dramedy film directed by Hitoshi Matsumoto. The film had its world premiere at 2013 Toronto International Film Festival on September 12, 2013.

Plot
Ordinary businessman Takafumi Katayama signs a contract to join a mysterious BDSM club where various dominatrices, each with their own specialty skill, will attack and humiliate him in public. The contract lasts for one year and no cancellation is allowed. At first, Takafumi is greatly pleased by his membership, but when the club's activities start to intrude into his home life, Takafumi must find a way to protect his family and himself from more than just humiliation.

The film features a subplot in which a group of confused people are watching Takafumi's story, a film-within-a-film directed by an elderly man who claims that one must have lived 100 years to understand its true brilliance.

Cast
Nao Ōmori as Takafumi Katayama
Shinobu Terajima as Whip Queen
Hitoshi Matsumoto
Ai Tominaga
Eriko Sato
Naomi Watanabe as Saliva Queen
You
Suzuki Matsuo
Atsuro Watabe
Gin Maeda
Katagiri Hairi as Gobble Queen
Lindsay Kay Hayward as CEO
Mao Daichi as Voice Queen

Reception
R100 received positive reviews from critics. Review aggregator Rotten Tomatoes reports that 81% of 21 film critics have given the film a positive review, with a rating average of 6.7 out of 10.

Rob Nelson of Variety, said in his review that "If a dominatrix is one who takes total control of her passive partner, then "R100" is the cinematic equivalent of a kinky femme fatale in black leather and stiletto heels, cracking a whip and a smile." Deborah Young in her review for The Hollywood Reporter praised the film by saying that "It’s hard to remember a film about S&M as funny as this one, or one as beautifully and weirdly imagined." Colin Covert of Minneapolis Star Tribune gave the film three stars by saying that ""To call this Midnight Movie entry "not for everyone" is understating it. But connoisseurs of weird, twisted sex comedy will revel in its transgressive, audacious mischief." Katie Rife of The A.V. Club gave the film a B+.

Release
The film premiered on September 12, 2013 on the Toronto International Film Festival and was released on March 3, 2015 on Blu-ray Disc in a 1080p video format and DVD over Drafthouse Films.

References

External links
 Official website
 
 

2013 films
2013 comedy-drama films
Japanese comedy-drama films
Films directed by Hitoshi Matsumoto
2013 comedy films
BDSM in films
2010s Japanese films